Lakshadweep Territorial Congress Committee (or Lakshadweep TCC) is the wing of Indian National Congress in the parts of Lakshadweep.
Muhammed Hamdulla Sayeed is the present president.

See also
 Indian National Congress
 Congress Working Committee
 All India Congress Committee
 Pradesh Congress Committee

References

External links

Indian National Congress by state or union territory